Strallegg is a municipality in the district of Weiz in the Austrian state of Styria.

Geography
Strallegg lies in the east Styrian hills.

Structure 
The municipal area of Strallegg consists of the following four subdivisions:

 Außeregg
 Feistritz
 Pacher
 Strallegg

References

Cities and towns in Weiz District